The Collins Cottages Historic District is a historic district encompassing a summer cottage resort in southern Eastham, Massachusetts.  It consists of a group of small cottages built by Lewis and Bernard Collins in 1928–29 on a parcel of land on the shore of Town Cove, and were typical of a type of accommodation offered to tourists of the time.  The property is located northeast of the Orleans rotary, and is accessed via a section of the old state highway.  The cottages continue to be operated as summer accommodations by members of the Collins family.

The district was listed on the National Register of Historic Places in 1999.

See also
National Register of Historic Places listings in Barnstable County, Massachusetts

References

Historic districts in Barnstable County, Massachusetts
Eastham, Massachusetts
National Register of Historic Places in Barnstable County, Massachusetts
Historic districts on the National Register of Historic Places in Massachusetts